The Château de La Chapelle-Faucher is a castle in La Chapelle-Faucher, Dordogne, Nouvelle-Aquitaine, France. It was built in the 13th century, and modified in the 15th, 17th and 18th century. It was struck by lightning in 1916, which destroyed the roofs of the castle. These have not been rebuilt.

References

Further reading

Guy Penaud, Dictionnaire des châteaux du Périgord, p. 74, éditions Sud Ouest, 1996, 

Châteaux in Dordogne
Monuments historiques of Dordogne
Castles in Nouvelle-Aquitaine